is a Japanese boxer. He competed in the men's featherweight event at the 1976 Summer Olympics.

References

1956 births
Living people
Japanese male boxers
Olympic boxers of Japan
Boxers at the 1976 Summer Olympics
Place of birth missing (living people)
Asian Games medalists in boxing
Boxers at the 1978 Asian Games
Asian Games bronze medalists for Japan
Medalists at the 1978 Asian Games
Featherweight boxers